The Institute of Nuclear and New Energy Technology (INET) is an energy research institute located in Tsinghua University, Beijing, China. The current Institute director is Zhang Zuoyi (张作义).

History
It was founded in 1960 as a top nuclear research centre.  It is located in the northern suburbs of Beijing near Changping tiger village.

In 1964, Tsinghua University researchers developed an independently designed reactor, completed the power pile shield experiment. The department made the most important contribution for the Chinese nuclear power industry as they develop nuclear fuel post-processing technologies.

Campus
Institute of Nuclear and New Energy Technology  covers approximately 740,000 square meters in total. The actual floor space 100,000 square meters, have one floor space 5,000 square meters scientific researches in the school use the office building—to be able the branch building.

The institute is equipped with  17 laboratories, 14 laboratories, and the courtyard manages the enterprise and the production workshop. Has one double reactor core of the swimming pool type reactor, one shell type low temperature heating experiment reactor, one high temperature air cooled experiment piles, one set of 900 megawatt water-cooled reactors nuclear power stations simulator.

Administration
The institute offers 11 disciplines. It also offers nuclear power science and security as a  discipline for domestic leading key discipline. The institute teaching and administrative staff consist of 470 people, include Chinese Academy of Science academician 1 person. It also has 20 experts, 34 people PhD postgraduate, 58  full-time professors, 104 associate professor.

After 30 years, the institute has achieved ten national key scientific researches task, yields one batch of important scientific researches results. It has been awarded 160 achievements win the ministries and commissions level science and technology achievement prize, 18 achievements win the national level prize. It has also been awarded 139 patents.

See also
 Tsinghua University
 HTR-PM (a pebble-bed reactor at Tsinghua)

References

External links 
 Official Site 

Tsinghua University
Research institutes in China
Energy in China
Nuclear research institutes

zh:清华大学